
De Brave Hendrik was a  fine dining restaurant in Hendrik-Ido-Ambacht, Netherlands. It was awarded one Michelin star in 1990 and retained that rating until 1996.

History
The restaurant was originally named In Den Braven Hendrik and located at Kerkstraat 7. This building was originally home to H.I. Ambacht's technical drawing school "Vakteekenschool". Later the restaurant renamed to De Brave Hendrik and housed at Kerkstraat 30.

Henk van Ark and head chef Jan Klein owned the restaurant from 1982 until 1994, when Klein left to start restaurant Hermitage in Rijsoord. In 1996, the restaurant became the second restaurant in the Netherlands to voluntarily give up its Michelin star. Restaurant 't Misverstant did this in 1994.

The restaurant closed down around 1997. A restaurant Sandelingen occupied the structure on Kerkstraat 30 before the structure returned to residential purposes. Kerkstraat 7 continues to house restaurants through 2018.

See also
List of Michelin starred restaurants in the Netherlands

References 

Restaurants in the Netherlands
Michelin Guide starred restaurants in the Netherlands
Defunct restaurants in the Netherlands
Hendrik-Ido-Ambacht